Gianmarco Soresi is an American stand-up comedian, actor, podcaster, and internet personality.

Early life and education 
He has a father of Italian heritage and a Jewish mother. A native of Potomac, Maryland, he earned a Bachelor of Fine Arts degree in theatre from the University of Miami in 2011.

Career 
After completing college, Soresi moved to New York to pursue comedy and acting full-time. In 2020, he released his first special, Shelf Life which prompted NPR's Pop Culture Happy Hour to call Soresi "a distinctive comic voice... giving voice to our collective anxiety". Soresi performed as a part of the "New Faces" showcase at the 2022 Just for Laughs festival in Montreal, where the Daily Comedy News Podcast said that "he’s the one to keep the eye on... he was absolutely fantastic". In addition to live comedy performances, Soresi also hosts The Downside with Gianmarco Soresi, an interview-based comedy podcast which was featured in a 5-page spread in Podcast Magazine by Kenneth Bator who said "the art of comedy and the art of complaining are on display for all to enjoy". As an actor, he has appeared in the film Hustlers and episodes of The Last O.G., Blue Bloods, and others. He has been called "one of the funniest people to grace the interwebs" by Comedy Cake, "a true comedian" by Podcast Magazine  and in May 2022, Houston Press asserted that "Soresi is undoubtedly on his way up." Soresi made his late night debut on the Late Late Show With James Corden on November 23, 2022.

Filmography

Film

Television

References 

Living people
American comedians
People from Potomac, Maryland
Comedians from Maryland
University of Miami alumni
Jewish American male comedians
Year of birth missing (living people)